Empire Airport  is a public use airport located at the northwest corner of the former town of Empire, in Washoe County, Nevada, United States. It is owned by the US Bureau of Land Management, and leased to U.S. Gypsum Company.

Facilities and aircraft 
Empire Airport covers an area of 75 acres (30 ha) at an elevation of 3,990 feet (1,216 m) above mean sea level. It has two runways with dirt surfaces: 7/25 is 3,170 by 48 feet (966 x 15 m) and 18/36 is 3,770 by 42 feet (1,149 x 13 m).

For the 12-month period ending December 30, 2011, the airport had 150 general aviation aircraft operations, an average of 12 per month. At that time there was one single-engine aircraft based at this airport.

See also 
 List of airports in Nevada

References

External links 
  from Nevada DOT
 Aerial image as of June 1994 from USGS The National Map
 

Airports in Nevada
Transportation in Washoe County, Nevada
Buildings and structures in Washoe County, Nevada